Brodrick Thomas may refer to:

Broderick Thomas (born 1967), American football player
Brodric Thomas (born 1997), American basketball player

See also
Thomas Brodrick (disambiguation)